Calamaria bitorques is a species of snake of the family Colubridae. It is commonly known as the Luzon dwarf snake.

Geographic range
The snake is endemic to the Philippines where it is found on the islands of Luzon and Panay.

References 

Calamaria
Endemic fauna of the Philippines
Reptiles of the Philippines
Taxa named by Wilhelm Peters
Reptiles described in 1872